Joice Heth (February 19, 1836) was an African-American woman who was exhibited by P.T. Barnum with the false claim that she was the 161-year-old nursing mammy of George Washington. Her exhibition under these claims, and her public autopsy, gained considerable notoriety.

Biography
Little is known of Heth's early years. In 1835, she was held as a slave by John S. Bowling and exhibited in Louisville, Kentucky. In June 1835, she was sold to promoters R.W. Lindsay and Coley Bartram. Lindsay introduced her as having been the childhood nurse of George Washington, but, lacking success, he sold her in her old age to P.T. Barnum. Posters advertising her shows in 1835 included the lines, "Joice Heth is unquestionably the most astonishing and interesting curiosity in the World! She was the slave of Augustine Washington, (the father of Gen. Washington) and was the first person who put clothes on the unconscious infant, who, in after days, led our heroic fathers on to glory, to victory, and freedom. To use her own language when speaking of the illustrious Father of this Country, 'she raised him'. Joice Heth was born in the year 1674, and has, consequently, now arrived at the astonishing age of 161 years".

She was, toward the end of her life, blind and almost completely paralyzed (she could talk, and had some ability to move her right arm) when Barnum started to exhibit her on August 11, 1835, at Niblo's Garden in New York City. For skeptics that discounted the legitimacy of Heth's age, her body aided in the belief of her exaggerated age. Harriet Washington states that at the time of her display, Heth had a very small frame, deep wrinkles, was toothless, and had fingernails that resembled talons. Washington explains that Heth's toothless mouth was a result from Barnum forcefully extracting her teeth so that she would look older. As a 7-month traveling exhibit for Barnum, Heth told stories about "little George" and sang a hymn. Eric Lott claims that Heth earned the impresario $1,500 a week, a princely sum in that era. Barnum's career as a showman took off. Her case was discussed extensively in the press. As doubt had been expressed about her age, Barnum announced that upon her death she would be publicly autopsied. She died the next year in Bethel, Connecticut, at the home of Barnum's brother Philo. Barnum stated that Joice's remains were "buried respectably" in his home town of Bethel, CT.

Public autopsy
Joice Heth died in New York City on February 19, 1836, aged around 79. To gratify public interest, Barnum set up a public autopsy. When Rogers declared the age claim a fraud, Barnum insisted that the autopsy victim was another person, and that Heth was alive, on a tour to Europe. Barnum later admitted the hoax.

See also
Human zoo
Sarah Baartman
John Smith, subject of another longevity hoax

Notes

References

, Edgewood Publishing, 1891; accessed December 3, 2007. The most detailed of these accounts, including information about Barnum's purchase of Heth, a detailed description of her appearance, how Barnum exhibited her, etc.

External links
The Life of Joice Heth, the Nurse of Gen. George Washington, (the Father of Our Country) New York: The Author, 1835.

1750s births
1836 deaths
Impostors
18th-century American slaves
American blind people
American people with disabilities
Hoaxes in the United States
Longevity myths
19th-century hoaxes
Year of birth uncertain
Date of birth unknown
Place of birth unknown
Place of death missing